Himmat ( Dare) is a 1996 Bollywood action film directed by Sunil Sharma, starring Sunny Deol, Tabu and Shilpa Shetty. The film was released on 5 January 1996.

Cast

Music
Music: Anand–Milind

Soundtrack 

The music of the film was composed by Anand Chitragupt and Milind Chitragupt. Lyrics were penned By Sameer. The soundtrack was released in 1994 on Audio Cassettes, on Tips Music, which consists of 7 songs. The full album was recorded by Kumar Sanu, Udit Narayan, Alka Yagnik, Poornima, Abhijeet, Bali Brahmabhatt, & Suresh Wadkar

Track list

References

External links
 

Indian action films
1996 films
1996 action films
1990s Hindi-language films
Films scored by Anand–Milind